Willy Heldenstein (4 September 1896 – 4 September 1990) was a Luxembourgian bobsledder. He competed in the four-man event at the 1928 Winter Olympics.

References

1896 births
1990 deaths
Luxembourgian male bobsledders
Olympic bobsledders of Luxembourg
Bobsledders at the 1928 Winter Olympics
Sportspeople from Luxembourg City